Claude Brousson (1647–1698) was a French Huguenot lawyer and preacher.
His work for the Huguenots is explained in the book by Dr. Samuel Smiles.

He returned to France after the Revocation of the Edict of Nantes, and was broken on the wheel in 1698.

References

External links
Six Heroic Men: John Frith; T. Fowell Buxton; David Livingstone; Richard Baxter; John Lawrence; Claude Brousson. by [[William Garden Blaikie]]
https://web.archive.org/web/20060113122213/http://www.puc.edu/PUC/newsevents/news/2003/20030325_utt.shtml

Relation Sommaire des Merveilles que Dieu fait en France, Claude Brousson, 1694 (Éditions Ionas, 2016).

Further reading 
 Utt, Walter C., and Brian E. Strayer. The Bellicose Dove; Claude Brousson and Protestant Resistance to Louis XIV, 1647–1698.  Portland, OR: Sussex Academic Press, 2013.

1647 births
1698 deaths